Mary Price (born 27 April 1942) is a female former English international lawn bowler and indoor bowler.

Bowls career
She is from Farnham Common in Slough and played competitive cricket, badminton, squash, and hockey but achieved her greatest successes in bowls. After winning the National title in 1988 she became the first woman in England to win both the indoor and outdoor singles titles. She subsequently won the singles at the British Isles Bowls Championships in 1989. Her greatest win was arguably the singles title at the 1991 World Indoor Bowls Championships.

World Outdoor Championships
Price has won five World Championships medals at consecutive Championships starting with a bronze medal in the pairs and silver medal in the fours at the 1988 World Outdoor Bowls Championship. Four years later in Ayr she won a fours bronze and at the 1996 World Outdoor Bowls Championship in Leamington Spa she won another fours bronze medal. the fifth and final medal arrived in Johannesburg in 2000 when she won a pairs bronze with Jean Baker at the 2000 World Outdoor Bowls Championship.

Commonwealth Games
Price has won three bronze medals at consecutive Commonwealth Games. She gained a bronze medal in the fours at the 1986 Commonwealth Games and bronze medals in the pairs at the 1990 Commonwealth Games and 1994 Commonwealth Games.

Atlantic Championships
Price has won four medals Atlantic Bowls Championships. In 1995 she won the fours bronze medal in Durban. Two years later in Wales she won double gold in the singles and pairs (with Katherine Hawes. Her fourth and final medal was in 1999 in the fours.

References

English female bowls players
Living people
1943 births
Commonwealth Games medallists in lawn bowls
Commonwealth Games bronze medallists for England
Indoor Bowls World Champions
Bowls players at the 1986 Commonwealth Games
Bowls players at the 1990 Commonwealth Games
Bowls players at the 1994 Commonwealth Games
Bowls players at the 1998 Commonwealth Games
Medallists at the 1986 Commonwealth Games
Medallists at the 1990 Commonwealth Games
Medallists at the 1994 Commonwealth Games